Tokyo Debut is a live album by saxophonist Art Pepper recorded in Japan in 1977 by TBS Radio and originally released on the Japanese Polydor label in 1990 as First Live in Japan before being rereleased on the Galaxy label in 1995.

Reception

The AllMusic review by Scott Yanow noted "The unexpected enthusiasm of the crowd really got to Pepper and his improvisations (even though he is not playing with his regular group) are quite inspired. Memorable music".

Track listing 
All compositions by Art Pepper except where noted.
 Introduction - 2:23
 "Cherokee" (Ray Noble) - 12:03
 "The Spirit Is Here" - 8:58
 "Here's That Rainy Day" (Jimmy Van Heusen, Johnny Burke) - 6:47
 "Straight Life" - 6:27
 "Manteca" (Dizzy Gillespie, Chano Pozo, Gil Fuller) - 12:59 	
 "Manhã de Carnaval" (Luiz Bonfá, Antônio Maria) - 7:49
 "Samba de Orpheus" (Luiz Bonfa) mistitled as Felicidade on CD and incomplete  - 3:00

Personnel 
Art Pepper - alto saxophone 
Clare Fischer - electric piano 
Rob Fisher - bass
Peter Riso - drums
Poncho Sanchez - percussion - except tracks 3,4 and most of track 2 
Cal Tjader - vibraphone (tracks 6-8) 
Bob Redfield - guitar (tracks 6-8)

References 

Art Pepper live albums
1995 live albums
Galaxy Records live albums